The French women's football champions are the winners of the highest league of football in France for women, the Division 1 Féminine. Since the creation of the women's first division by the French Football Federation in 1975, the women's football championship of France has been contested through the Division 1 Féminine. Prior to this, the first division championship of French women's football was contested through a league ran by the Fédération des Sociétés Féminines Sportives de France (FSFSF), a women's football organization in France that was led by women's football pioneer Alice Milliat. The FSFSF's league ran from 1918 to 1932 and awarded 14 league titles before being disbanded due to the prohibition of women's football.

FSFSF Championship (1918–1932)
 1919 Fémina Sports Paris (1)
 1920 En Avant Paris (1)
 1921 En Avant Paris (2)
 1922 Les Sportives de Paris (1)
 1923 Fémina Sports Paris (2)
 1924 Fémina Sports Paris (3)
 1925 Fémina Sports Paris (4)
 1926 Fémina Sports Paris (5)
 1927 Fémina Sports Paris (6)
 1928 Fémina Sports Paris (7)
 1929 Fémina Sports Paris (8)
 1930 Fémina Sports Paris (9)
 1931 Fémina Sports Paris (10)
 1932 Fémina Sports Paris (11)
Source:

FSFSF championship results by team

FFF Championship (from 1974–75)

 1975 Stade Reims (1)
 1976 Stade Reims (2)
 1977 Stade Reims (3)
 1978 AS Etroeungt (1)
 1979 AS Etroeungt (2)
 1980 Stade Reims (4)
 1981 AS Etroeungt (3)
 1982 Stade Reims (5)
 1983 VGA Saint-Maur (1)
 1984 ASJ Soyaux (1)
 1985 VGA Saint-Maur (2)
 1986 VGA Saint-Maur (3)
 1987 VGA Saint-Maur (4)
 1988 VGA Saint-Maur (5)
 1989 CS Saint-Brieuc (1)
 1990 VGA Saint-Maur (6)
 1991 FC Lyon (1)
 1992 FCF Juvisy (1)
 1993 FC Lyon (2)
 1994 FCF Juvisy (2)
 1995 FC Lyon (3)
 1996 FCF Juvisy (3)
 1997 FCF Juvisy (4)
 1998 FC Lyon (4)
 1999 Toulouse OAC (1)
 2000 Toulouse OAC (2)
 2001 Toulouse OAC (3)
 2002 Toulouse FC (4)
 2003 FCF Juvisy (5)
 2004 Montpellier HSC (1)
 2005 Montpellier HSC (2)
 2006 FCF Juvisy (6)
 2007 Olympique Lyonnais (1)
 2008 Olympique Lyonnais (2)
 2009 Olympique Lyonnais (3)
 2010 Olympique Lyonnais (4)
 2011 Olympique Lyonnais (5)
 2012 Olympique Lyonnais (6)
 2013 Olympique Lyonnais (7)
 2014 Olympique Lyonnais (8)
 2015 Olympique Lyonnais (9)
 2016 Olympique Lyonnais (10)
 2017 Olympique Lyonnais (11)
 2018 Olympique Lyonnais (12)
 2019 Olympique Lyonnais (13)
 2020 Olympique Lyonnais (14)
 2021 Paris Saint-Germain (1)
 2022 Olympique Lyonnais (15)

FFF championship results by team

References

External links
  fff.fr - Official page on the site of the French Football Federation
 France - List of Women Champions and Runners-Up at RSSSF
  Championnat de France de D1 - Palmarès at Footofeminin.fr

Champions
France
Champions
champions
Football